Jonas Björkman and Robin Söderling were the defending champions, but Björkman retired from tennis before being able to defend the title.

Söderling teamed up with Robert Lindstedt, but Jaroslav Levinský and Filip Polášek defeated them in the final 1–6, 6–3, [10–7].

Seeds

Draw

Draw

External links
Draw

Swedish Open - Men's Doubles
Swedish Open
Swedish